Samuel Cabell may refer to:

 Samuel Jordan Cabell (1756–1818), American Revolutionary war officer and U.S. congressman
 Samuel I. Cabell (died 1865), plantation owner